Ole Henrik Moe (11 January 1920 – 29 July 2013) was a Norwegian pianist, art historian and art critic.

He was born in Lillehammer, and is the brother of archaeologist Anne Stine Ingstad. During World War II he was a member of the intelligence organization XU. He was arrested in October 1942, and was incarcerated in the Sachsenhausen concentration camp from 1943 to 1945.

He was manager of the Henie-Onstad Art Centre from 1966 to 1989. Among his works are Slekten Knagenhjelm og Kaupanger from 1960, and biographies of Lars Hertervig and Inger Sitter. He was decorated Knight, First Class of the Order of St. Olav in 1980, and was Officer of the French Légion d'honneur. He was awarded the Arts Council Norway Honorary Award in 1995. He died in July 2013.

References

1920 births
2013 deaths
People from Lillehammer
XU
Norwegian resistance members
Sachsenhausen concentration camp survivors
Directors of museums in Norway
Norwegian male pianists
Norwegian art historians
Officiers of the Légion d'honneur
20th-century pianists
20th-century Norwegian male musicians